V. N. Rajasekharan Pillai (born 20 October 1949) is the vice-chancellor of Somaiya Vidyavihar University and provost of Somaiya Vidyavihar, Pillai concurrently serves as the chancellor of the ICFAI University, Tripura. He was president of Mewar University, Chiittorgarh, Rajasthan, India (2016–2018).

Career

Pillai is the Founder President of Human Development Foundation India, a Civil Society Organisation in the National Capital Region, New Delhi.

He served as the executive vice-president of the Kerala State Council for Science, Technology and Environment, Govt of Kerala (2011–2014). Simultaneously, he held the positions of principal secretary, Science & Technology Dept. of the Govt. of Kerala, chairman of the Kerala Coastal Zone Management Authority, and the Kerala Biotechnology Commission.  

Prior to that, he was the vice-chancellor of the Indira Gandhi National Open University (IGNOU), New Delhi (2006–2011). He served as vice-chairman and chairman of the University Grants Commission, Govt of India, New Delhi, during the period 2002–2006. 

He was executive director of the National Assessment and Accreditaition Council (NAAC), Govt of India, during the period 2000–2002.

Prior to that, Pillai was the vice-chancellor of the Mahatma Gandhi University, Kottayam, Govt of Kerala and held additional charge of the Cochin University of Science and Technology (1996–2000). 

In 2000, he was on a visiting research professor assignment in the University of Lausanne, Switzerland. 

From 1983 to 1996, Pillai worked in various academic and research executive positions in the Mahatma Gandhi University, Kottayam such as the founder professor and director of the School of Chemical Sciences, dean of Faculty of Science, founder director of the School of Professional Distance Education, director, College Development Council and controller of examinations of the university. 

From 1977 to 1983, Pillai worked as a postdoctoral research fellow, on deputation from Calicut University, Kerala, in the Universities of Tubigen and Mainz, Germany. 

From 1971 to 1983, he worked in the Universities of Kerala and Calicut University as UGC/CSIR Junor and senior research fellow, assistant professor and associate professor in the area of chemical sciences.

Fellowships
 Elected Fellow of the Indian Academy of Sciences.
 Distinguished Fellow of the Kerala Academy of Sciences
 Honorary Fellow of the Institution of Electronics and Telecommunication Engineers (IETE), New Delhi
 Fellow of the Royal Society of Chemistry 
 Honorary Senior Fellow of the Jawaharlal Nehru Centre for Advanced Scientific Research, Banaglaore

Role in higher education

A teacher and researcher in the field of Chemical Sciences, Pillai has held post-doctoral and visiting research professor positions in the University of Tübingen (Mainz, Germany and Lausanne, Switzerland). 

He created a research group in the area of biopolymers and peptides, has published extensively in this area, and has supervised over 50 doctoral students. He holds an international patent for the gram-scale preparation of biologically important peptides.

Academic and administrative positions
Pillai has served as chairman and vice-chairman of the University Grants Commission (UGC), director of the (NAAC), Bangalore, Vice-Chancellor of the Mahatma Gandhi University, Kottayam, Kerala, vice-chancellor of the Cochin University of Science and Technology,  founder-director of the School of Chemical Sciences; dean of Faculty of Science; controller of examinations; director of College Development Council; founder-director of the School of Professional Distance Education and chief, Employment and Information Guidance Bureau of the Mahatma Gandhi University.

See also 

 Somaiya Vidyavihar
 K.J. Somaiya College of Engineering

References

Indian academic administrators
20th-century Indian chemists
Living people
1949 births
People from Alappuzha district
Scientists from Kerala